Gege may refer to:

Gege (title), Manchu style of an imperial-born princess of an emperor
Gege, Eswatini, town in Shiselweni, Eswatini
Gégé (footballer) (born 1988), Cape Verdean footballer
Gege Kizubanata (born 1981), Democratic Republic of the Congo basketball player
Gegë Marubi (1907–1984), Albanian photographer
Gege Soriola (born 1988), Nigerian footballer
Ghegs or Gegë, north Albanians